M320 Grenade Launcher Module (GLM) is the U.S. military's designation for a new single-shot 40 mm grenade launcher system to replace the M203 for the U.S. Army, while other services initially kept using the older M203. The M320 uses the same High-Low Propulsion System as the M203.

History
In 2004, the Army announced a requirement for a commercial off-the-shelf 40 mm grenade launcher. It had to be more reliable, ergonomic, accurate, and safer than the M203. It had to be able to fire all 40 mm low-velocity grenades but be loaded from the breech to accept future longer projectiles. Heckler & Koch's submission was selected in May 2005.

After the U.S. Army at Picatinny Arsenal conducted a competitive bidding process for a new 40 mm grenade launching system, Heckler & Koch was awarded a contract to provide the XM320 beginning in 2006. The M320 was developed from but is not identical to the Heckler & Koch AG36 (a key distinguishing feature being the addition of a folding foregrip ahead of the trigger for use when the weapon is in stand-alone configuration, a feature the AG36 lacks). The M320 entered production in November 2008.

Fielding of the M320 was planned to begin in February 2009, with 71,600 GLMs planned to phase out the M203 by 2015. The weapon was officially fielded in July 2009 at Fort Bragg by the 1st Brigade Combat Team, 82nd Airborne Division. In June 2017, Bravo Company, 2nd Combat Engineer Battalion became the first U.S. Marine Corps unit to be issued the M320. Following initial experiments, the Marines expect to issue 7,000 launchers between 2019 and 2022.

Overview
The M320 has three major parts: a grenade launcher with rifled barrel, Day/Night Sight (DNS) produced by Insight Technology, Inc and a hand held Laser Range Finder (LRF). Some of the benefits are:
 The M320 can be used in two ways. It can be attached to the M16 assault rifle, CAR-15 carbine, M4 carbine, HK416, or other types of rifles, attaching under the barrel forward of the magazine, or it can be used dismounted with a stock attached as a stand-alone model. A grenadier carrying an M320 with an M4 and three dozen 40 mm grenades will have a total weapon load of 38 lb (17 kg).
 The Day/Night Sight allows the grenadier to effectively engage the enemy in the dark.

The M320 is based on the earlier Heckler & Koch AG-C, but with some Army-specific modifications. It includes a folding foregrip and shorter barrel for a more compact package. The sights had to be reconfigured to shoot accurately with the slightly different ballistics from the shorter barrel length. The system was supposed to be lighter than the M203 (it is actually slightly heavier) and does not require specific mounting hardware. Breech loading allows the grenadier to load a shell while keeping the sight on target. The sights on the M320 are located to the side of the launcher, avoiding the problems that the M203 had with its sight design, which were mounted on top of the launcher and could interfere with the rifle's sights, so they had to be attached separately. This meant two separate operations had to be performed when adding the grenade launcher to the weapon, and since the sights were not integral to the M203, they had to be re-zeroed every time the launcher was reattached to the rifle. The LRF helps eliminate range estimation errors common in shots greater than 100 meters, thus increasing first round hit probability.

The M320 can fire all NATO high-explosive, smoke, and illumination grenades. Its breech opens to the side, allowing it to fire a variety of newer rounds which are longer, in particular certain non-lethal rounds, such as Federal Laboratories' "exact impact" (brand name) non-lethal sponge batons or sponge grenades. The M320 operates in double-action mode, with an ambidextrous safety. In case of misfire, the M320 operator merely has to pull the trigger again. The M203 used a single-action mode, which cocks the weapon as the barrel is opened. The M203 operator has to open the barrel by unlocking it and pushing forward to cock the weapon and then re-close the barrel, then pull the trigger again. The problem with this is that in opening the barrel, the grenade is designed to eject and the operator must ensure that it does not fall to the ground.

The M320 is one of two 40 mm grenade launchers capable of firing Pike Missile (developed by Raytheon) without modification—the other being the FN EGLM (Enhanced Grenade Launching Module) developed for the FN SCAR.

Nonetheless, the weapon's introduction was not without criticism:
 Soldiers complained about switching from the simple, more streamlined M203 to one with more sophisticated attachments (although this could be attributed simply to the change from a long-standing "tried and true" system to a new one).  Complaints ranged from the forward grip and sighting system, the pistol grip handle catching on things, and the side loading mechanism. They even criticized its ability to act as a stand-alone launcher, a feature included in response to troops re-acquiring Vietnam-era M79 grenade launchers that supposedly gave better accuracy when fired from the shoulder than if slung under a rifle, although the collapsible stock is somewhat short for the task.

 The M320 has the ability to fire detached from a rifle. Soldiers have reported difficulties carrying it unmounted, as its one-point sling does not hold it securely. Carrying by the sling would cause it to bounce around and sometimes be dragged through dirt. Soldiers wanted to carry the M320 in a holster to provide protection, rather than just putting it in their rucksack. The Natick Soldier Systems Center began the M320GL Holster Soldier Enhancement Program (SEP) in November 2012. Three commercial vendors produced 167 holsters each. The SEP used the "buy-try-decide" concept, which allows the Army to test the functionality of equipment without spending much time on research and development. Soldiers from the 75th Ranger Regiment were given a dozen holsters and went through standardized tests in mid-May 2013, after which they filled out surveys. The next step was to test them with an entire brigade. As of July 2013, the holsters were being evaluated by soldiers in Afghanistan. Project officials were to make a recommendation to Fort Benning by the beginning of fiscal year 2014.

Users
 
 
 <ref
name="Heckler & Koch M320 GLM (HK AG36) 40mm Single-Shot Under-Barrel Grenade Launcher (UBGL) (2010)"/>
 
 
 
 
 
 
 :United States Army, United States Marine Corps and United States Air Force

See also
 KAC Masterkey
 M26 Modular Accessory Shotgun System
 Rifle grenade
 Underslung Grenade Launcher
 Pike (munition)
 AMD-65
 XM25 CDTE
 Related Lists:
 List of individual weapons of the U.S. Armed Forces
 List of crew served weapons of the US Armed Forces
 United States 40 mm grenades

References

External links

 XM320 40 mm Grenade Launcher Module (GLM) Fact sheet
 2008 Heckler & Koch Military and LE brochure
 AG36 / AG-C / EGLM / XM320 grenade launcher page on Modern Firearms site
 M320 on GlobalSecurity.org
 XM320 page on HK USA site

40×46mm grenade launchers
Grenade launchers of the United States
Heckler & Koch grenade launchers
Military equipment introduced in the 2000s